Bhajanpura is a residential area in the North East District of Delhi, India,  from Shahdara and  from old Delhi railway station. It is a highly populated portion of the Trans Yamuna area. The are is currently used for commercial activities and is very well suited for residential purposes.

There are few major attractions in Bhajanpura, but there is built out infrastructure. Transportation hubs include the nearby interstate bus terminal, railway station (Anand Vihar). This areas proximity to New Delhi and Old Delhi means there is a plethora of educational institutions like Lal Bahadur Shastri college which affiliated with Delhi University. Also, nearby is the Northern India Engineering college affiliated with I.P. University which also  from Bhajanpura. Additional infrastructure is being built in the area such as the Sonia Vihar power plant.

The main landmark of Bhajanpura is Bhajanpura Chowk, which is very busy all time. There are various blocks in Bhajanpura such as A, B, C, D etc. and every street is given a number.

Unlike its neighborhood Yamuna VIhar, Bhajanpura is not well planned with no parks at all making it a congested place.

Interesting fact is that C block of Bhajanpura is actually Block A of Yamuna Vihar (as per the locals).

Safety 
Around 2012, gates were installed in the busier streets so as to prevent unwanted traffic from the Pusta side. Security guards were also appointed. This not only led to an increase in traffic but also an increased crime rate involving crimes such as snatching of chains. On 10December 2014 two men/boys snatched a gold chain from a girl by showing her a gun.

Signature Bridge 
The "Signature Bridge" over the Yamuna River was proposed in 2002, and work started in 2007. The bridge would greatly alleviate traffic problems in North Delhi, and would be the first asymmetrical cable bridge in India. The bridge was completed by late 2018.

References 

Neighbourhoods in Delhi
East Delhi district